"Call Out" is a song by Feeder, released as the group's first single from their seventh album Renegades in 2010. The single was given no airplay attention with the music video only available to see on the band's website for a limited time and on YouTube. At first the single was going to be released on a CD format, but due to a lack of interest in the single from the media the CD format was cancelled with the track then given away free online as a download, this was then followed by the release of the single on 1,000 limited pressings on the 7" vinyl format. The b-side "Fallen", appeared at the time as an instrumental while the league table was shown on Match of the Day and on the special edition of Renegades.

Music video
The track's video features Grant Nicholas and bassist Taka Hirose playing in a room alongside new drummer Karl Brazil. In the room is also a girl wearing a balaclava while having the lyrics of the song written all over her in a graffiti typeface. As the lyrics are sung by Grant, the corresponding lyric is shown on her body. During the guitar bridge solo, she is seen spinning round with a red sheet and walks off the set as the video and song comes to its final chorus.

Track listing

7" vinyl
 "Call Out" (single edit) - 3:22
 "Fallen" - 2:24

References

2010 singles
2010 songs
Feeder songs
Songs written by Grant Nicholas